Dilyimit Tudi (Chinese: 迪力依米提·土地; born 25 February 1999), also known as Dilümüt Tudi, is a Uyghur-Chinese  professional footballer  who plays as a midfielder for Chinese Super League club Changchun Yatai.

Club career
Dilyimit Tudi was born in Xinjiang. He joined Guangzhou Evergrande's youth setup prior to the 2019 season, before spending a year on loan with then-China League One club Xinjiang Tianshan Leopard. He established himself during the 2019 China League One season and made 23 league appearances for the first team, guiding them to a comfortable 13th place in the Chinese second tier.

His efforts on loan attracted the interest of Changchun Yatai, who signed him to a permanent deal in February 2020. Due to the 2020 China League One season being delayed, the club did not officially announce his arrival until August 2020. Tudi played in 12 of the team's 15 games during the 2020 China League One campaign, helping the team claim the title and win promotion back into the Chinese Super League.

International career
On 20 July 2022, Dilyimit made his international debut in a 3-0 defeat against South Korea in the 2022 EAFF E-1 Football Championship, as the Chinese FA decided to field the U-23 national team for this senior competition.

Career statistics

Honours

Club
Changchun Yatai
China League One: 2020

References

External links
 

Living people
1999 births
People from Xinjiang
Chinese footballers
Association football midfielders
Guangzhou F.C. players
Xinjiang Tianshan Leopard F.C. players
Changchun Yatai F.C. players